NGC 5824 is a globular cluster in the constellation Lupus, almost on its western border with Centaurus. Astronomers James Dunlop (1826), John Herschel (1831) and E.E. Barnard (1882) all claim to have independently discovered the cluster. It is condensed and may be observed with small telescopes, but larger apertures are required to resolve its stellar core.

A stellar stream, known as the Triangulum stellar stream, is thought to have originated from NGC 5824. It is located quite far from NGC 5824 and is part of its leading tail. Meanwhile, its trailing tail has also been detected, spanning about 50 degrees through the sky.

References

External links

Globular clusters
Lupus (constellation)
5824